HMS Loch Achray was a  of the Royal Navy. She was built by Smith's Dock Co. Ltd. in South Bank-on-Tees and launched on 7 July 1944. After service in World War II, she was sold to the Royal New Zealand Navy and renamed HMNZS Kaniere (F426) in September 1948. After service in the Korean War, she was used as a training ship from 1957. She was sold in 1966 for breaking up in Hong Kong.

HMS Loch Achray
After sea trials Loch Achray joined the 8th Escort Group in March 1945 for service in the Western Approaches. The crew abandoned ship and the U-boat was taken in tow after being boarded, but sank the next day.

After the German surrender in May 1945 Loch Achray took part in "Operation Deadlight", escorting surrendered German U-boats from Scapa Flow to Loch Ryan.

In September 1945 Loch Achray joined the East Indies Escort Force in the Indian Ocean in supporting military operations and assisting with returning liberated prisoners of the Japanese to Singapore. The ship returned to Portsmouth in July 1946, and was placed in reserve. In 1948, she was part of a lot of six Loch-class frigates refitted and sold at a combined cost of £232,750 to New Zealand.

HMNZS Kaniere
Kaniere was commissioned in Portsmouth, England on 27 September 1948, and arrived in Auckland, New Zealand in January 1949, joining the 11th Frigate Flotilla. Patrols and exercises occupied her until November 1951 when she was put in reserve.

Recommissioned in November 1952, she joined the United Nations Naval Task Group based at Sasebo, carrying out her first patrol along the west coast of Korea in April 1953. She remained there after the declaration of the cease-fire in August, finally returning to Auckland in April 1954. In September the warship joined the 3rd Frigate Squadron, Far East Fleet, based at Singapore, as part of the Commonwealth Strategic Reserve. She was detached to UN support duties off Korea, based at Sasebo, from October 1954 until May 1955, and returned to Auckland in July. After a refit she rejoined the 3rd Frigate Squadron in March 1956, once again being engaged in UN support duties from June to July.

From October 1956 until April 1957 Kaniere helped address the Malayan Emergency off Borneo, returning to Auckland in June to refit. Kaniere was then assigned as a training ship, taking part in exercises, training cruises and port visits.

On 17 November 1958, Kaniere towed the coaster Port Waikato, which had engine failure near the Chatham Islands, to Port Lyttelton.

On 3 August 1959 Kaniere collided with the ferry Makora in dense fog off Devonport.

The ship was decommissioned in 1961, and served as a harbour training ship until 1965. Kaniere was sold for scrapping in 1966.

Decommissioning and fate
On 18 January 1967 Kaniere was paired with her sister ship  and towed by the tug Daisy to Hong Kong for breaking up.

References
Notes

Bibliography
 
 HMS Loch Achray at Uboat.net
 lochclassfrigates.com

 

Achray
World War II frigates of the United Kingdom
1944 ships